
AMD PowerNow! is AMD's dynamic frequency scaling and power saving technology for laptop processors.  The CPU's clock speed and VCore are automatically decreased when the computer is under low load or idle, to save battery power, reduce heat and noise.  The lifetime of the CPU is also extended because of reduced electromigration, which varies exponentially with temperature.

The technology is a concept similar to Intel's SpeedStep technology. The adaptation of PowerNow! for AMD's desktop CPUs is called Cool'n'Quiet. Newer Opterons also use an adaptation of PowerNow! called Optimized Power Management.

AMD has supplied and supported drivers for its PowerNow! technology that work on Windows 98, ME, NT, and 2000.

Processors supporting PowerNow!
 K6-2+
 K6-III+
 Athlon XP-M - some models.
 Mobile Athlon 64
 Mobile Sempron
 Turion 64 and X2
 Athlon II
 AMD Accelerated Processing Unit

See also
 Dynamic frequency scaling
Power Saving Technologies:
 AMD Cool'n'Quiet (desktop CPUs)
 AMD PowerTune (graphics)
 Intel SpeedStep (CPUs)
Performance Boosting Technologies:
 AMD Turbo Core (CPUs)
 Intel Turbo Boost (CPUs)

References

External links

 AMD PowerNow!

AMD technologies
Computer hardware tuning

X86 architecture
Laptops